Sada Kristin Jackson (née, Irvine Spearman; born June 4, 1983) is an American Christian R&B and urban contemporary gospel artist and musician. She started her music career, in 2009, with the band Press Play, where she was the lead vocalist for two years. Her solo music career got underway, in 2015, with the release of the studio album, Long Story Short, independently, in 2015.

Early life
Sada Jackson was born Sada Kristin Irvine Spearman, on June 4, 1983, in Kansas City, Missouri, whose father is Grover and mother is Ileana, who raised her and her siblings, older brother, Justin, and younger brother, Ryan, in Kansas City, Kansas, at the Quindaro Church of God in Christ. This is where she would hone her singing acumen, at the age of three years. Her parents divorced in the mid-2000s. Her parents both got diagnosed with cancer, but are both still living, with her dad's in remission, while her mom's is still in the healing process.

Music career
Her music recording career commenced in 2009, when she was a member of the Christian pop band, Press Play, where she was their lead vocalist for two years, until a catastrophic knee injury sidelined her, in June 2011. This caused her to depart the band, where she had to focus her efforts at healing the injury she sustained. She started her individual music recording career in 2015, with the studio album, Long Story Short, that released on January 27, 2015, independently. The album got reviewed by CCM Magazine, New Release Today and The Journal of Gospel Music, in three four star reviews. She sings the national anthem for the Kansas City Royals.

Personal life
She is married to Kenneth Roy "Kenny" Jackson, who is also her manager. They reside in Los Angeles, California.

Discography
Studio albums
 Long Story Short (January 27, 2015, independent)

References

External links
 Official Website

1983 births
Living people
African-American songwriters
African-American Christians
Musicians from Kansas City, Missouri
Musicians from Kansas City, Kansas
Musicians from Los Angeles
Songwriters from Missouri
Songwriters from Kansas
Songwriters from California
21st-century African-American people
20th-century African-American people